Diego Alejandro Sosa (born 28 July 1997) is an Argentine footballer who plays for Tigre.

References

1997 births
Living people
Argentine footballers
Argentine expatriate footballers
Association football fullbacks
Footballers from Buenos Aires
Club Atlético Tigre footballers
Unión Española footballers
Chilean Primera División players
Argentine Primera División players
Argentine expatriate sportspeople in Chile
Expatriate footballers in Chile